Brandon Charter Township is a charter township of Oakland County in the U.S. state of Michigan.  The population was 15,175 at the 2010 census. 

The village of Ortonville is located within the township.

History
The Township of Brandon was created in 1837, named in honor of the settlers of the Town of Brandon, Vermont, whose descendants had migrated to this area of Michigan. The Charter Township of Brandon was formed in the 20th century.

Communities
Brandon Gardens is located on M-15/Ortonville Road and Glass Road ( Elevation: 971 ft./296 m.).
Oakwood straddles the eastern border with Oxford Township at Baldwin and Oakwood Roads ( Elevation: 1099 ft./335 m.).
Ortonville is a village located within the township.
Perry Lake Heights is located on Perry Lake west of Perry Lake Road ( Elevation:  1030 ft./314 m.).

Geography

Demographics
As of the census of 2000, there were 14,765 people, 5,012 households, and 4,039 families residing in the township. The racial makeup of the township was 97.58% White, 0.40% African American, 0.24% Native American, 0.36% Asian, 0.01% Pacific Islander, 0.39% from other races, and 1.02% from two or more races. Hispanic or Latino of any race were 1.59% of the population.

There were 5,012 households, out of which 45.0% had children under the age of 18 living with them, 67.8% were married couples living together, 8.8% had a female householder with no husband present, and 19.4% were non-families. 15.0% of all households were made up of individuals, and 3.9% had someone living alone who was 65 years of age or older.  The average household size was 2.92 and the average family size was 3.25.

In the township the population was spread out, with 30.6% under the age of 18, 6.6% from 18 to 24, 35.2% from 25 to 44, 22.0% from 45 to 64, and 5.5% who were 65 years of age or older.  The median age was 35 years. For every 100 females, there were 100.3 males.  For every 100 females age 18 and over, there were 99.4 males.

The median income for a household in the township was $66,458, and the median income for a family was $70,359. Males had a median income of $52,419 versus $32,068 for females. The per capita income for the township was $25,011.  About 3.0% of families and 4.4% of the population were below the poverty line, including 4.8% of those under age 18 and 8.7% of those age 65 or over.

Education
Most of Brandon Township is in Brandon School District, while a portion to the east is in Oxford Community Schools. The respective zoned high schools are Brandon High School, and Oxford High School.

References

External links

Brandon Township

Townships in Oakland County, Michigan
Charter townships in Michigan
Metro Detroit
1837 establishments in Michigan
Populated places established in 1837